The Rooiberg girdled lizard (Cordylus imkeae) is a species of lizard in the family Cordylidae. It is a small, spiny lizard found in South Africa.

References

Cordylus
Endemic reptiles of South Africa
Reptiles described in 1994
Taxa named by Pieter Le Fras Nortier Mouton
Taxa named by Johannes H. van Wyk